Mangelia fieldeni is a species of sea snail, a marine gastropod mollusk in the family Mangeliidae.

Description

Distribution
This species occurs in the Mediterranean Sea along Greece and Cyprus.

References

 Cecalupo A. & Quadri P. (1996). Contributo alla conoscenza malacologica per il Nord dell'isola di Cipro (Terza e ultima parte). Bollettino Malacologico 31(5–8): 95-118-page(s): 99-101; p. 117 fig. 4,4a,4b
 Buzzurro G. & Greppi E. (1997). Notes on the Mollusks of Cyprus, with special attention to the allochtone species. La Conchiglia 283: 21–31, 61–62
 Gofas, S.; Le Renard, J.; Bouchet, P. (2001). Mollusca, in: Costello, M.J. et al. (Ed.) (2001). European register of marine species: a check-list of the marine species in Europe and a bibliography of guides to their identification. Collection Patrimoines Naturels, 50: pp. 180–213

fieldeni
Gastropods described in 1978